Fred Forsberg may refer to:
 Fred Forsberg (sailor) (1862–1939), Swedish sailor 
 Fred Forsberg (American football) (born 1944), former American football player